Bodryy ("brisk") was a Project 135 Burevestnik-class Large Anti-Submarine Ship (BPK) or Krivak-class frigate. Launched on 15 April 1971, the vessel served with the Soviet Navy until it was dissolved and then was transferred to the Russian Navy. The ship played a key role in helping the Soviets develop techniques for tracking ballistic missile submarines in the 1970s. Bodryy was retired on 17 July 1997 and scrapped.

Design and development

Development
Designed by N.P. Sobolov, Bodryy was the second Project 1135 Large Anti-Submarine Ship (BPK) laid down. The vessel is named for a Russian word which can be translated brisk, vigorous, energetic, bright, cheerful or alert. Bodryy served with the Soviet Navy, and the Russian Navy after the dissolution of the Soviet Union, as an anti-submarine frigate. The ship was designated a Guard Ship (SKR) from 28 July 1977.

Design
A complement of 180, including 22 officers, was carried.

Armament
The ship was designed for Anti-submarine warfare around four URPK-3 Metel missiles (NATO reporting name SS-N-14 'Silex'), backed up by a pair of quadruple  torpedoes and a pair of RBU-6000  anti-submarine rocket launchers. The main armament was upgraded to URPK-5 Rastrub (SS-N-14B) between 1982 and 1984. Defence against aircraft was provided by forty 4K33 OSA-M (SA-N-4'Gecko') surface to air missiles which were launched from four ZIF-122 launchers. Two twin  AK-726 guns were mounted aft. Mines were also carried, either eighteen IGDM-500 KSM, fourteen KAM, fourteen KB Krab, ten Serpey, four PMR-1, seven PMR-2, seven MTPK-1, fourteen RM-1 mines or twelve UDM-2.

The ship had a well-equipped sensor suite, including a single MR-310A Angara-A air/surface search radar, Volga navigation radar, Don navigation radar, MP-401S Start-S ESM radar system, Nickel-KM and Khrom-KM IFF and ARP-50R radio direction finder. An extensive sonar complement was fitted, including MG-332 Titan-2, MG-325 Vega and MGS-400K, along with two MG-7 Braslet anti-saboteur sonars and the MG-26 Hosta underwater communication system. The PK-16 ship-borne decoy dispenser system was fitted; this was replaced by the PK-10 system in 1983.

Construction and service

Construction
Bodryy was laid down by Yantar in Kaliningrad on 15 January 1969, and was given the yard number 152. The vessel was launched on 15 April 1971 and commissioned on 31 December later that year.

Service
Bodryy was commissioned with the Baltic Fleet on 14 February 1972 as part of the 128th Brigate. Between 14 June and 29 November that year, the ship operated in the Mediterranean as part of Task Force KUG-1 under  alongside sistership . The Task Force undertook training in anti-submarine warfare and provided Soviet presence in the region in support of allies Egypt and Syria. Afterwards, in April 1973, the vessel was transferred to the first of many periods in the Atlantic Ocean and Caribbean Sea. Initially serving under , the vessel developed methods for tracking ballistic missile submarines of the US Navy off Rota, Andalusia. Testing continued with towed array sonar between June 1977 and January 1976 in the central Atlantic and Caribbean. In the 1970s, eight out ten of the crew were commended by the commanding officer for their combat and political training.

The vessel started the 1980s operating in the North Sea and visited Helsinki between 7 and 10 August 1981. This was followed by visits to the African cities of Luanda in Angola and Lagos in Nigeria in June and July 1982. The vessel was subsequently temporarily based at the Angolan capital between 7 January and 18 May 1987 and then 15 November 1990 and 16 May 1991 while operating in the South Atlantic. The ship was decommissioned on 17 July 1997. Subsequently Bodryy was transferred to be scrapped at Yantar in 1998.

Pennant numbers

References

Citations

Bibliography
 
 
 
 
 

1971 ships
Krivak-class frigates of the Russian Navy
Ships built in the Soviet Union
Ships built at Yantar Shipyard
Cold War frigates of the Soviet Union